Operation Dervish was the first of the Arctic Convoys of the Second World War by which the Western Allies supplied material to the Soviet Union against Nazi Germany. Included in the convoy was the personnel and equipment of an RAF Wing, for the air defence of the Russian ports, several civilians and diplomatic missions.

The convoy sailed from Liverpool on 12 August 1941 and arrived at Archangelsk on 31 August 1941.

Co-incident with the Dervish convoy, civilians in the Spitzbergen archipelago were evacuated in Operation Gauntlet (25 August – 3 September 1941) and Dervish was followed by Operation Strength (30 August – 14 September 1941) to transport aircraft for No. 151 Wing RAF at Archangel; both operations succeeded.

Background
On 22 June 1941, the Soviet Union was invaded by Nazi Germany and its allies. That evening, Winston Churchill broadcast a promise of assistance to the USSR against the common enemy. On 7 July, Churchill wrote to Stalin and ordered the British ambassador in Moscow, Stafford Cripps, to begin discussions for a treaty of mutual assistance. On 12 July, an Anglo-Soviet Agreement was signed in Moscow, to fight together and not make a separate peace. On the same day a Soviet commission met the Royal Navy and the RAF in London and it was decided to use the airfield at Vaenga (now Severomorsk) as a fighter base to defend ships unloading at the ports of Murmansk, Arkhangelsk and Polyarny. The First Sea Lord, Admiral Dudley Pound considered such proposals unsound, "with the dice loaded against us in every direction". When Arctic convoys passed by the north of Norway into the Barents Sea, they came well into range of German aircraft, U-boats and ships operating from bases in Norway and Finland.

Prelude

Plans
The Dervish convoy was part of a series of operations in the Arctic during August 1941. In July the British had conducted Operation EF, an attack on the ports of Kirkenes and Petsamo by carrier aircraft, while the fast minelayer  had run to Archangel with a cargo of parachute mines. At the end of July a cruiser force commanded by Rear Admiral Philip Vian had investigated the Spitzbergen archipelago for signs of German activity and had destroyed a weather station on Hope Island. In August a convoy of six ships loaded with war materiel was to sail to Archangel, together with a contingent of RAF personnel to prepare the way for Operation Strength, a plan to fly 48 Hurricane fighters from the aircraft carrier  to airfields in Russia, in a similar manner to the Club Run operations in the Mediterranean. At the same time Vian was to return to Spitzbergen and evacuate the population in Operation Gauntlet.

Ships
The convoy consisted of the merchant ships Lancastrian Prince, New Westminster City, Esneh, Trehata, the elderly (ex-Union Castle liner) SS Llanstephan Castle, the fleet oiler  and the Dutch freighter Alchiba. The convoy carried wool, rubber and tin and 24 crated Hawker Hurricane fighters aircraft. There were several civilians, including Vernon Bartlett MP, the US newspaper reporter Wallace Carrol, the Polish expressionist painter and official British and Polish war artist Feliks Topolski, a Polish legation, a Czechoslovak commission and Charlotte Haldane, a noted feminist and member of the Communist Party of Great Britain, who lectured on Domestic life in Russia as part of an impromptu course laid on by the civilians.

The convoy was also accompanied by the cruiser ,  to join the force for Operation Gauntlet.

Voyage
The convoy sailed for Scapa Flow in the Orkney Islands from Liverpool on 12 August 1941 and arrived on 16 August. Another fifteen Hurricanes packed in crates were loaded on the other ships at Scapa Flow. The ships departed from Scapa Flow on 17 August and the convoy reached Hvalfjord in Iceland on 20 August, departing for Russia the next day. The Gauntlet force departed Scapa Flow on 19 August and rendezvoused with the cruiser Aurora, which had been sailing with the Dervish convoy. The Distant Cover Force sailed on 24 August, taking station near Bear Island to cover all operations against surface attack by the German Navy.

The convoy sailed towards the Svalbard Archipelago and the midnight sun, to circle as far north around Norway as possible. The danger of  attacks on Murmansk led to the ships being diverted to Archangelsk, another  to the east. As Llanstephan Castle sailed upriver to dock, rifle shots were heard and a member of the crew was hit in the arm, the gunfire coming from people onshore, who mistook the British uniforms for German ones. The Gauntlet force departed Spitzbergen on 3 August, returning to Scapa Flow on 10 September. The Strength force sailed on 30 August, as the Dervish convoy was arriving and reached the flying-off point on 7 September. This was accomplished and the force returned to port on 14 September. The Distant Cover Force returned at the same time, after launching air attacks on targets in occupied Norway.

Other operations

Operation Gauntlet

Operation Gauntlet was an Allied Combined Operation to land on the Spitzbergen archipelago, to evacuate Norwegian and Soviet civilians there and to destroy facilities to deny them to the Germans. A force of two cruisers and four destroyers, with the troopship Empress of Canada and a replenishment oiler left British waters on 19 August 1941, arriving at Spitzbergen on 25 August. After evacuating Soviet coal miners at Barentsburg and Norwegians at Longyearbyen, the coal mining and shipping infrastructure, equipment and stores there were destroyed. The Allies also suppressed wireless stations on the archipelago, to prevent the Germans receiving weather reports.

Operation Strength
Strength ferried pilots, their 24 Hurricanes and other personnel of 151 Wing RAF to Russia; the Hurricanes were flown off Argus direct to Vaenga airfield, near Murmansk. The ships reached the flying-off point safely due to the scarcity of  reconnaissance aircraft in the region. Normal naval aircraft used a ramp at the end of the flight deck to help get into the air but the Hurricane undercarriage turned out to be not robust enough and the first two Hurricanes to take-off were damaged. The rest of the aircraft avoided the ramp and the damaged Hurricanes crashed on landing at Vaenga.

Aftermath
Dervish was followed by a regular series of convoys numbered like their Atlantic counterparts. The first homeward-bound convoy, QP 1 included the Dervish merchant ships and carrying Polish troops stranded in the USSR, left Archangelsk on 28 September 1941 and arrived at Scapa Flow on 9 October. The eleven ships of Convoy PQ 1, the first convoy of the PQ series, carrying twenty tanks, 193 fighter aircraft and other cargo, sailed from Iceland on 28 September, arriving at Archangelsk on 11 October after an uneventful trip.

Commemoration
The operation is often remembered in both countries as an example of direct co-operation between of British Armed Forces and the Red Army. The British Prime Minister and Minister of Defence, Winston Churchill, said that the operation and the larger convoys were "the worst journey in the world". Many veterans of the operation have since 2012 been awarded the Arctic Star for their service. In August 2016, on the occasion of the 75th anniversary of the start of the Operation, Princess Anne visited Arkhangelsk to celebrate as a guest of Governor Igor Orlov. The Princess gave a speech and met Russian and British veterans of the operation. A Band of the Royal Marines performed alongside a military band from the Northern Fleet after a wreath laying ceremony.

Ships involved

Operation Dervish
The convoy comprised six merchantmen and one fleet oiler, protected by 14 escorts in relays. The convoy sailed from Loch Ewe on 12 August and arrived at Archangel on 31 August.

The force sailed from Scapa Flow on 24 August and returned on 14 September.

Operattion Gauntlet
The ships sailed from the Clyde on 19 August and returned on 7 September.

Operation Strength
The ships in this operation sailed from Scapa Flow on 30 August and returned on 14 September.

Footnotes

References

Further reading
 
 
 
 

Dervish